The 2010 Silverstone Superbike World Championship round was the tenth round of the 2010 Superbike World Championship season. It took place on the weekend of July 30–August 1, 2010 at Silverstone.

Results

Superbike race 1 classification

Superbike race 2 classification

Supersport race classification

Silverstone Round
Silverstone Superbike